Events in the year 1942 in Norway.

Incumbents
Government in Exile (in London)
 Monarch – Haakon VII
 Prime Minister – Johan Nygaardsvold (Labour Party)
German Military Governor
 Reichskommissar in Norway – Josef Terboven
German Puppet Government in Oslo
 Minister-President – Vidkun Quisling (National Unification) – inducted on 1 February

Events

 1 February – Vidkun Quisling is appointed as the Minister-President of Norway by the German occupiers despite strong opposition.
 12 February – Vidkun Quisling meets Adolf Hitler.
 13 March – Vidkun Quisling restored the so-called "Jewish paragraph" of the Norwegian Constitution which forbade Jews to enter or settle in Norway (This paragraph was originally abolished on July 21, 1851). This paragraph was in force until 1945. Quisling was convicted after the war on illegal amendment of the Constitution.
 15 April – About 500 Norwegian teachers are sent to forced labour in Kirkenes.
 30 April – German forces destroy the entire Norwegian fishing village of Telavåg as a retaliation action after having discovered four days earlier that two men from the Linge company were being hidden in the village.
 25 September – Allied bombers tried to bomb the Victoria Terrasse building in Oslo, which was used as the Gestapo headquarters, but missed the target and instead hit civilian targets. 4 civilians are killed.
 6 October – Martial law is declared in Trondheim: During this time, 34 Norwegians were murdered by extrajudicial execution.
 21 October – The German prisoner ship Palatia is sunk off Lindesnes by a Royal New Zealand Air Force torpedo bomber, in the second deadliest ship disaster in Norwegian history
 26 October – All Jewish men in Norway over 15 are arrested; all Jewish property is ordered confiscated. See the Holocaust in Norway for more.
 17 September – The prime minister Vidkun Quisling reintroduces the death penalty
 24 November – All Norwegian Jewish women and children are arrested.
 26 November – 548 Norwegian Jewish men, women and children are transported on the ship SS Donau to Stettin. And from there they were later taken by train to Auschwitz concentration camp. Only eight of those deported on the SS Donau survived.

Popular culture

Sports

Music

Film

Literature

Notable births

January
 

2 January – Jens Petter Ekornes, businessperson (died 2008)
9 January – 
Per Haddal, journalist, film critic and writer
Johan Lind, speed skater
13 January – Vigdis Ystad, literary historian (died 2019)
19 January – Knut O. Aarethun, politician
24 January 
 Nils Bjørnflaten, politician
 Olav Nilsen, international soccer player
 Vivian Zahl Olsen, artist, graphic designer and illustrator.
30 January – Kåre Gjønnes, politician and minister (died 2021)
31 January – Mette Newth, illustrator and author of children's literature

February
 

2 February – Trygve Bornø, international soccer player
5 February – Oddny Aleksandersen, politician and Minister
7 February – Otto Hauglin, sociologist and politician (died 2012).
9 February – Peder Lunde Jr., sailor and Olympic gold medallist
12 February – Finn Arild Hvistendahl, businessperson
14 February – Arne Ruste, poet, essayist, novelist, and magazine editor.
16 February – Else Michelet, satirical writer, radio show host and producer (died 2021).
18 February – Bernt Oftestad, historian and theologian
21 February – Anders C. Sjaastad, politician and Minister
28 February – Alf Ivar Samuelsen, politician

March
 

7 March – Ivar Eriksen, speed skater and Olympic silver medallist
8 March – Håkon Fimland, hurdler and politician
10 March – Einar Steensnæs, politician and Minister
12 March – Karin Lian, politician
28 March – Stig Berge, orienteer and World Champion
28 March – Pål Tyldum, cross country skier and double Olympic gold medallist
31 March – Hans Jacob Biørn Lian, diplomat

April
 

1 April – Jan Fredrik Christiansen, trumpeter
2 April – Torgeir Kvalvaag, journalist
7 April – Bjørn Gunnar Olsen, journalist, novelist, playwright and biographer (died 1992).
8 April – Reidar Goa, footballer (died 2018).
21 April – Jon Mostad, composer.
22 April – Egil "Drillo" Olsen, international soccer player and coach

May
 

5 May – Kjetil Hasund, footballer.
6 May – Svein-Erik Stiansen, speed skater
21 May – Tharald Brøvig Jr., ship-owner and investor (died 2017).
31 May – Olav Skjevesland, theologian and priest (died 2019).

June
6 June – Ingrid Piltingsrud, politician
9 June – Egil Myklebust, businessperson and lawyer
11 June – Per Willy Guttormsen, speed skater
15 June – Bjørg Andersen, handball player.
17 June – Torgrim Sollid, jazz and traditional folk trumpeter, and composer and musician
18 June – Knut Grøholt, civil servant
21 June – Ditlef Eckhoff, jazz trumpeter
22 June – Åge Danielsen, civil servant.

July

13 July – Sigrid Sundby, speed skater (died 1977)
15 July – Signe Howell, social anthropologist.
16 July – Jens Ulltveit-Moe, businessperson
23 July – Sverre Asmervik, psychologist, novelist and non-fiction writer.
23 July – Anne Aaserud, art historian and museum director (died 2017).
30 July – Harald Bjorvand, linguist.
31 July – Triztán Vindtorn, poet and performance artist (died 2009).

August
7 August – Sverre Bagge, historian
9 August – Odd Flattum, sports official and politician
11 August – Tove Kari Viken, politician
12 August – Eldrid Nordbø, politician and Minister
22 August – Finn Fuglestad, historian
25 August – Terje Fjærn, musician, orchestra leader and musical conductor (died 2016)
28 August – Sigurd Manneråk, politician (died 2003)
28 August – Tor Berntin Næss, diplomat

September
5 September – Björn Haugan, operatic lyric tenor
9 September – Ulf Guttormsen, politician
13 September – Bjørg Hope Galtung, politician
20 September – Einar M. Bull, diplomat
24 September – Leif Lund, politician (died 2004)
25 September – Ragnar Pedersen, illustrator ("Joker"), magazine editor and revue writer (died 2007).
29 September - Kirsten Reitan, politician

October
2 October – Gro Sandvik, classical flautist
11 October – Leif Yli, cyclist.
14 October – Arne Torp, linguist.

November
 

6 November – 
Tora Aasland, politician and Minister
Gunhild Hagestad, sociologist.
12 November –
Aud Inger Aure, politician and Minister
Sissel Lie, author, playwright and professor.
14 November – Are Næss, physician and politician
15 November – Ivar Østberg, politician
16 November – Hans Olav Sørensen, ski jumper
19 November – Berit Kvæven, politician
24 November – Erling Walderhaug, politician
26 November – Jan Stenerud, American football placekicker
29 November – Oddrun Hokland, athlete (died 2022).

December

6 December – Herbjørg Wassmo, author
8 December – Eyvind W. Wang, politician
13 December – Arne Treholt, politician and diplomat convicted of high treason and espionage on behalf of the Soviet Union and Iraq
19 December – Brit Hoel, politician
20 December – Odd Martinsen, cross country skier, Olympic gold medallist and World Champion.
21 December – 
Ivar Langen, professor of Mechanical Engineering
Rodney Riise, ice hockey player (died 2009).
23 December – Grynet Molvig, actress and singer
28 December – Svein Magnus Håvarstein, sculptor and printmaker (died 2013).
31 December – Bendik Rugaas, politician and Minister

Full date unknown
Idun Reiten, mathematician.
John Kristen Skogan, political scientist and politician

Notable deaths

16 January – Henry Wilhelm Kristiansen, newspaper editor and politician (born 1902)
19 January – Sven Aarrestad, writer, politician and leader in the Norwegian temperance movement (born 1850)
19 January – Martin Ulvestad, Norwegian-American historian and author (born 1865)
29 January – Wictor Esbensen, mariner and explorer (born 1881)
10 February – Jørgen Bjørnstad, gymnast and Olympic silver medallist (born 1894)
10 February – Ola Thommessen, newspaper editor (born 1851)
22 February – Rolf Jacobsen, jurist, politician and Minister (born 1865)
28 February – Arne Mortensen, rower and Olympic bronze medallist (born 1900)
4 March – Johannes Stubberud, newspaper editor (born 1891)
7 March – Ole Monsen Mjelde, politician and Minister (born 1865)
24 March – Karenus Kristofer Thinn, judge (born 1850)
20 April – Helga Estby, noted for her walk across the United States during 1896 (born 1860)
13 May – Einar Sverdrup, mining engineer and businessman (born 1895)
14 May – Bjørn Bjørnson, actor and theatre director (born 1859)
20 May – Nini Roll Anker, novelist and playwright (born 1873).
23 May – Sten Abel, sailor and Olympic silver medallist (born 1872)
27 June – Jens Thiis, art historian, conservator and museum director (born 1870)
15 July – Ragnvald A. Nestos, governor of the U.S. state of North Dakota (born 1877)
21 July – Nils Olaf Hovdenak, politician and Minister (born 1854)
6 October – Harald Langhelle, newspaper editor and politician (born 1890)
26 October – Gulbrand Lunde, politician (born 1901)
1 November – Carl Fredrik Kolderup, geologist (born 1869).
5 December – Adolf Indrebø, politician (born 1884)

Full date unknown
Alfred Evensen, musician (born 1883)
Niels Thorshaug, veterinarian (born 1875)

See also

References

External links